The Birmingham Club was an English association football club based at the cricket pitch on the Aston Lower Grounds, and one of the first clubs in Birmingham.

History

The club was formed by C. H. Quilter, the owner and operator of the Lower Grounds amusement park and gardens, out of players from the Aston United cricket club,  in part as an extra attraction for visitors, and having been persuaded to do so by "a Sheffielder called Webster"; many of its players were Quilter's employees at the Lower Grounds.  Quilter himself was a regular player for the club.

The club gave its foundation date as 1875 although there is at least one reported match from the previous year, against the Birmingham Clerks Association club.  By 1877 the club boasted 150 members and, although its first game was to association rules, it was also a member of the Sheffield Football Association and played some matches to the Sheffield rules.  In 1876 the club was the first from outside the city to beat Sheffield F.C., doing so by one goal to nil; in the season the club played 20, and won 8, drew 5, and lost 5.  

The club also experimented with rugby union rules, but, after the death of Wilcox in a match against Derby Rugby Club in March 1876, refused to engage any further such fixtures.

The B.C.C. experimented with playing under floodlighting in 1878, by hosting a match at the Lower Grounds against Nottingham Forest illuminated by "Jablockoff Electric Lights".  The experiment was not a success owing to the weather - a pre-match storm destroyed a number of lights, and another storm during the match caused its abandonment.

The club entered the FA Cup in 1879–80, being drawn against Panthers F.C., who withdrew, in the first round, and losing 6–0 at home to Oxford University in the second, after holding the University to 1–0 at half-time, but having to play an hour of the match with ten men after Nicholls broke his collarbone.  The crowd of 4-500 was considered "very small" and blamed on the "intense cold", as it contrasted with the 6,000 at the Lower Grounds the previous week for the match between the Birmingham Football Association and Scotland.

In the early 1880s, the cricket pitch was sold off for housing.  The club had rarely entered competitive tournaments (its only match in the Birmingham Senior Cup was in 1879, a 4–1 defeat to Saltley College), and, although the club held athletics events at the Lower Grounds until September 1880, there is no record of any further games after the Senior Cup defeat.

Colours

The club's colours were described red, or scarlet, and blue, which probably refers to the design being hoops.

Notable players

Howard Vaughton, future England international while playing for Aston Villa
George Tait, future England international while playing for Birmingham Excelsior F.C.

References

Association football clubs established in 1875
Defunct football clubs in England
1875 establishments in England
Association football clubs established in the 19th century
Football clubs in Birmingham, West Midlands